Temescal, Temascal and Temazcal are all forms of the Nahuatl word  which refers to a type of sweat lodge used by indigenous Mesoamericans. 

Temescal, Temascal, or Temazcal might also refer to:

Mexico 
 Temascal, Oaxaca
 Temazcal Limestone

United States

Alameda County, California
 Temescal, Oakland, California, a neighborhood
 Temescal Creek (Northern California)
 Lake Temescal
 Temescal Regional Park, the park surrounding Lake Temescal.

Los Angeles & Ventura Counties, California
 Rancho Temescal
 Temescal Canyon, Los Angeles County

Riverside County, California
 Rancho Temescal (Serrano)
 Temescal Canyon
 Temescal Canyon High School (Lake Elsinore, California)
 Temescal Creek (Riverside County)
 Temescal Freeway, a name for California State Route 71
 Temescal Mountains
 Temescal Valley (California), a valley 
 Temescal Valley, California, a census-designated place
 Temescal Butterfield stage station
 Temescal, Corona, California, the settlement that grew up around Temescal Station

See also